Paul Flamant (1892–1940) was a French mathematician, known as the transcriber and editor of Gaston Julia's lectures published in the important monograph Leçons sur les Fonctions Uniformes à Point Singulier Essentiel Isolé (1924). According to Joseph Ritt, "Julia's monograph is probably one of the finest in the Borel collection."

Paul Flamant matriculated in 1913 at the École Normale Supérieure (ENS) as the highest-rated student, but before graduation went to the front in WW I as a second lieutenant in the French army. He was wounded at Charleroi and taken prisoner. He spent almost four years as a prisoner-of-war, then returned to the ENS and passed his agrégation (and was the highest-rated student for that year of examinations). He received his doctorate from the University of Strasbourg in 1924. He became a mathematics professor at the University of Strasbourg but his health was impaired for the rest of his life. At the beginning of WW II, as a captain in the reserves, he was stationed in the damp, cold bunkers of the Maginot Line. His health deteriorated and he soon died.

He was an Invited Speaker of the ICM in 1928 in Bologna and in 1936 in Oslo.

Selected publications
"Agrégation des sciences mathématiques (session de 1924)." Nouvelles annales de mathématiques : journal des candidats aux écoles polytechnique et normale, Série 5 : Volume 3 (1924): 342–343.
"Complément à la note de MH Hildebrandt." Annales de la Société Polonaise de Mathématique T. 5 (1926) (1927).
"Le développement d’une transmutation linéaire par rapport à la différentiation finie." Rendiconti del Circolo Matematico di Palermo (1884-1940) Volume 54, no. 1 (1930): 371–413.

References

1892 births
1940 deaths
20th-century French mathematicians
École Normale Supérieure alumni
University of Strasbourg alumni
Academic staff of the University of Strasbourg
French Army personnel of World War II
French Army officers
French military personnel killed in World War II